ITNOW (formerly The Computer Bulletin) is a bimonthly magazine aimed at IT professionals that is published on behalf of the British Computer Society (BCS) and sent to all its members. The magazine was started with the title The Computer Bulletin in London in 1957. It is published by Oxford University Press for the BCS and is sent to more than 70,000 IT professionals. The editor is Brian Runciman.

References

External links
 ITNOW website
 ITNOW information from the BCS
 

1957 establishments in the United Kingdom
Bi-monthly magazines published in the United Kingdom
Computer magazines published in the United Kingdom
British Computer Society
Magazines published in London
Magazines established in 1957
Oxford University Press
Professional and trade magazines